Spangold is a family of shape memory-effect alloys (SME) of gold, copper, and aluminum in either 18K or 23K which, when heated and cooled correctly, results in a multi-colored faceted finish which is appealing as jewelry.  The name of the family is a play on the word "spangled".

Spangold is a beta-phase alloy with a nominal stoichiometry of Au7Cu5Al4 and a nominal composition by mass of 76% gold, 18% copper, and 6% aluminum. The texture is caused by the induction of a martensitic-type phase transformation on a polished surface.

References

Precious metal alloys